Arkady Romanovich Rotenberg (born 15 December 1951) is a Russian billionaire businessman and oligarch. With his brother Boris Rotenberg, he was co-owner of the Stroygazmontazh (S.G.M. group), the largest construction company for gas pipelines and electrical power supply lines in Russia.

In 2021 Forbes estimated Rotenberg's wealth at $1.9 billion. He is a close confidant, business partner, and childhood friend of president Vladimir Putin. Rotenberg became a billionaire through lucrative state-sponsored construction projects and oil pipelines. The Pandora Papers leak implicated Rotenberg in facilitating and maintaining elaborate networks of offshore wealth for Russian political and economic elites.

Since 2014, following the Russian annexation of Crimea, Arkady Rotenberg has been subject to sanctions by the United States government.

Biography
Rotenberg is of Jewish ancestry. He was born in 1951 in Leningrad, where his father, Roman, worked in management at the Red Dawn telephone factory, allowing the family to avoid living in a communal apartment. In 1963, when he was age twelve, Rotenberg and Vladimir Putin both joined Anatoly Rakhlin's sambo club.

In 1978, Rotenberg graduated from the Lesgaft National State University of Physical Education, Sport and Health and became a judo trainer. After Putin returned to Russia in 1990, Rotenberg trained with him several times a week. During the 1990s, Rotenberg and his brother, Boris, who had moved to Finland, traded in petroleum products. When Putin became vice-mayor, Rotenberg secured funding from Gennady Timchenko to found Yavara-Neva, a professional judo club. Later, after the club won nine European Judo Championships and trained four Olympic champions, it was given a new state-funded $180 million facility, including a thousand-seat arena and a yacht club.

In 2000, Putin, who had become President of Russia, created Rosspirtprom, a state-owned enterprise controlling 30% of Russia's vodka market, and put Rotenberg in control. In 2001, Rotenberg and his brother founded the SMP bank, which operates in 40 Russian cities with over 100 branches, more than half of them in the Moscow area. SMP oversees the operation of more than 900 ATM-machines. SMP bank also became a leading large-diameter gas pipe supplier.

Gazprom often appears to have paid Rotenberg inflated prices. In 2007, Gazprom rejected an earlier plan to build a 350-mile pipeline and instead paid Rotenberg $45 billion, 300% of ordinary costs, to build a 1,500 mile pipeline to the Arctic Circle. In 2008, Rotenberg formed Stroygazmontazh (SGM) with five companies he had purchased from Gazprom for $348 million. The next year, the company earned over $2 billion in revenue. Rotenberg then bought Northern Europe Pipe Project, which eventually supplied 90% of Gazprom's large diameter pipes and operated at a 30% profit margin, twice the industry average. In 2013, Gazprom increased Rotenberg's contract for a Krasnodar pipeline by 45%, then continued payments for a year after the Bulgarian segment was canceled.

While he was the Minister of Transport of the Russian Federation from 20 May 2004 to 2012, Igor Levitin ensured in 2010 that Arkady Rotenberg's firms (Mostotrest) would construct the toll roads on Russian federal highways.

Rotenberg is the president of the Hockey Club Dynamo Moscow. In 2013, he became a member of the committee of the International Judo Federation. In preparation for the 2014 Winter Olympics in Sochi, Rotenberg won contracts worth $7 billion, including a $2 billion coastal highway and an underwater gas pipeline that came in at 300% of average costs.

Rotenberg was named in the Panama Papers. Those leaked legal documents show Rotenberg sent $231 million in loans to a company in the British Virgin Islands in 2013.

After Enlightenment became a private company in 2011, the government of the Russian Federation started to make several changes in that sector. In 2013, an internal council was formed by the Ministry of Education to check all textbooks. Many of Enlightenment's competitors’ books did not pass this new evaluation and so Enlightenment won about 70% of the contracts for new textbooks in the Russian Federation in 2014.

In 2015, Arkady Rotenberg sold to his son Igor Rotenberg a number of assets including up to 79% of Gazprom Drilling (Bureniye), 28% of the road construction company Mostotrest, and 33.3% of Jersey-based TPS Real Estate Holdings Ltd. Alexander Ponomarenko and Aleksandr Skorobogatko own 66.6% of TPC Real Estates Holdings.

It was reported that Arkady Rotenberg made this move after being placed on the U.S. sanctions list.

Sanctions

As a result of the annexation of Crimea by the Russian Federation, Barack Obama, then President of the United States, signed an executive order instructing his government to impose sanctions on the Rotenberg brothers and other close friends of President Putin, including Sergei Ivanov and Gennadi Timchenko. These persons were placed on the Specially Designated Nationals List.

As a result of the sanctions, Visa and MasterCard stopped servicing SMP Bank. In September 2014, Italy seized €30 million of Rotenberg's real estate, including four villas in Sardinia and Tarquinia, and a hotel in Rome. U.S added Arkady and Igor Rotenberg on their blacklist of Russian oligarchs, freezing assets for US$65 million in the same year. In November 2016, the General Court of the European Union confirmed the sanctions against Russia and the freezing of Arkady's funds which had taken effect on 30 July 2014, but limited to the new properties added by the Council of Europe in March 2015.

In September 2014, Novaya Gazeta published a journalistic inquiry of Anna Politkovskaja and Aleksei Navalny, revealing that Igor Rotenberg, son of Arkady, secretly controlled an estate in Monte Argentario through a society registered in Vaduz.

The Russian State Duma then proposed a bill, known as the Rotenberg Law, allowing sanctioned Russians to get compensated by the state, but it was declined.

Rotenberg is one of many Russian "oligarchs" named in the Countering America's Adversaries Through Sanctions Act, CAATSA, signed into law by President Donald Trump in 2017.

On 3 March 2022, the United States imposed visa restrictions and froze assets of Rotenberg, his sons, and his daughter due to the 2022 Russian invasion of Ukraine.

Sanctioned by New Zealand in relation to the 2022 Russian invasion of Ukraine.

Wealth
Rotenberg's personal wealth has been estimated in July 2021 at $2.9 billion. He used to own a 2009 Bombardier Global 5000 (registered M-BRRB) however was forced to sell it due to the sanctions placed upon him. He owns a 2011 Benetti 65 meter yacht named Rahil. The yacht can accommodate ten guests in seven staterooms.

Personal life
In 2005, Rotenberg married his second wife Natalia Rotenberg, who is about 30 years his junior. Their two children, Varvara and Arkady, live in the United Kingdom with Natalia. They divorced in 2015 in the U.K. While the financial details of the divorce are private, the agreement includes division of the use of a £35 million Surrey mansion and a £8 million apartment in London. The couple's lawyers obtained a secrecy order preventing media in the U.K. from reporting on the divorce, but the order was overturned on appeal.

His older three children include Igor, who is a Russian billionaire businessman, Liliya, who is a doctor and since 2014 has been living in Germany and co-owns the TPS Nedvizhimost (an investment group that owns shopping malls and entertainment complexes in the Russian cities Moscow, Sochi, Krasnodar, Novosibirsk and Ocean Plaza in Kyiv, Ukraine), and son Paul, who is a competitive hockey player.
According to the BBC, Arkady Rotenberg says he is the owner of Putin's Palace, an opulent Black Sea mansion, not President Vladimir Putin, as the leader's critics had alleged.

References

External links

 Arkady Rotenberg, Forbes Magazine

 
1951 births
Living people
BP people
Russian billionaires
Russian businesspeople in the oil industry
Lesgaft National State University of Physical Education, Sport and Health alumni
Businesspeople from Saint Petersburg
Soviet Jews
People named in the Paradise Papers
Russian individuals subject to the U.S. Department of the Treasury sanctions
Russian individuals subject to European Union sanctions
Russian oligarchs